Oregano (Origanum vulgare) is a species of flowering plant in the mint family Lamiaceae. It was native to the Mediterranean region, but widely naturalised elsewhere in the temperate Northern Hemisphere.

It is sometimes called wild marjoram, and its close relative, O. majorana, is known as sweet marjoram. Both are widely used as culinary herbs, especially in Turkish, Greek, Spanish, Italian, Hispanic, and French cuisine. Oregano is also an ornamental plant, with numerous cultivars bred for varying leaf colour, flower colour and habit.

Etymology
Used since the middle 18th century, the Spanish word orégano is derived from the Latin orīganum and ultimately from the Classical Greek  (orī́ganon).

Description and biology

Oregano is related to the herb marjoram, sometimes being referred to as wild marjoram. It has purple flowers and spade-shaped, olive-green leaves. It is a perennial, although it is grown as an annual in colder climates, as it often does not survive the winter.
It will grow in a pH range between 6.0 (mildly acidic) and 9.0 (strongly alkaline), with a preferred range between 6.0 and 8.0. It prefers a hot, relatively dry climate, but does well in other environments.

Taxonomy

Many subspecies and strains of oregano have been developed by humans over centuries for their unique flavours or other characteristics. Tastes range from spicy or astringent to more complicated and sweet. Simple oregano sold in garden stores as Origanum vulgare may have a bland taste and larger, less-dense leaves, and is not considered the best for culinary use, with a taste less remarkable and pungent. It can pollinate other more sophisticated strains, but the offspring are rarely better in quality.

The related species Origanum onites (Greece, Turkey) and O. syriacum (West Asia) have similar flavours. A closely related plant is marjoram from Turkey, which differs significantly in taste because phenolic compounds are missing from its essential oil. Some varieties show a flavour intermediate between oregano and marjoram.

Subspecies
Accepted subspecies:
 O. v. subsp. glandulosum (Desf.) Ietsw. – Tunisia, Algeria
 O. v. subsp. gracile  (K.Koch) Ietsw. (= O. tyttanthum) has glossy green leaves and pink flowers. It grows well in pots or containers, and is more often grown for added ornamental value than other oregano. The flavor is pungent and spicy. – Central Asia, Iran, India, Turkey, Afghanistan, Pakistan. 
 O. v. subsp. hirtum  (Link) Ietsw. – (Italian oregano, Greek oregano) is a common source of cultivars with a different aroma from those of O. v. gracile. Growth is vigorous and very hardy, with darker green, slightly hairy foliage. Generally, it is considered the best all-purpose culinary subspecies. – Greece, Balkans, Turkey, Cyprus
 O. v. subsp. virens (Hoffmanns. & Link) Ietsw. – Morocco, Spain, Portugal, Balearic Islands, Canary Islands, Azores, Madeira
 O. v. subsp. viridulum (Martrin-Donos) Nyman – widespread from Corsica to Nepal 
 O. v. subsp. vulgare – widespread across Europe + Asia from Ireland to China; naturalized in North America + Venezuela

Cultivars
Example cultivars of oregano include:
 'Aureum' – golden foliage (greener if grown in shade), mild taste: It has gained the Royal Horticultural Society's Award of Garden Merit 
 'Greek Kaliteri' – O. v. subsp. hirtum strains/landraces, small, hardy, dark, compact, thick, silvery-haired leaves, usually with purple undersides, excellent reputation for flavor and pungency, as well as medicinal uses, strong, archetypal oregano flavor (Greek kaliteri: the best)
 'Hot & Spicy' – O. v. subsp. hirtum strain
 'Nana' – dwarf cultivar
Cultivars traded as Italian, Sicilian, etc. are usually hardy sweet marjoram (O. ×majoricum), a hybrid between the southern Adriatic O. v. subsp. hirtum and sweet marjoram (O. majorana). They have a reputation for sweet and spicy tones, with little bitterness, and are prized for their flavor and compatibility with various recipes and sauces.

Uses

Culinary

Oregano is a culinary herb, used for the flavour of its leaves, which can be more intense when dried than fresh. It has an earthy, warm, and slightly bitter taste, which can vary in intensity. Good-quality oregano may be strong enough almost to numb the tongue, but cultivars adapted to colder climates may have a lesser flavour. Factors such as climate, season, and soil composition may affect the aromatic oils present, and this effect may be greater than the differences between the various species of plants. Among the chemical compounds contributing to the flavour are carvacrol, thymol, limonene, pinene, ocimene, and caryophyllene.

Oregano is the staple herb of Italian cuisine, most frequently used with roasted, fried, or grilled vegetables, meat, and fish. Oregano combines well with spicy foods popular in southern Italy. It is less commonly used in the north of the country, as marjoram is generally preferred. Its popularity in the U.S. began when soldiers returning from World War II brought back with them a taste for the "pizza herb", which had probably been eaten in southern Italy for centuries. 

Oregano is widely used in cuisines of the Mediterranean Basin and Latin America, especially in Mexican cuisine and Argentine cuisine. In Turkish cuisine, oregano is mostly used for flavouring meat, especially mutton and lamb. In barbecue and kebab restaurants, it can be usually found as a condiment, together with paprika, salt, and pepper.

During the summer, generous amounts of dried oregano are often added as a topping to a tomato and cucumber salad in Portugal, but it can be used to season meat and fish dishes as well. The dried and ground leaves are most often used in Greece to add flavour to Greek salad, and is usually added to the lemon-olive oil sauce that accompanies fish or meat grills and casseroles. In Albania, dried oregano is often used to make herbal tea which is especially popular in the northern part of Albania.

Oregano oil

Oregano oil has been used in folk medicine over centuries. Oregano essential oil is extracted from the leaves of the oregano plant. Although oregano or its oil may be used as a dietary supplement, there is no clinical evidence to indicate that either has any effect on human health.

In 2014, the US Food and Drug Administration (FDA) warned a Utah company, Young Living, that its herbal products, including oregano essential oil, were being promoted to have numerous unproven anti-disease effects, and so were being sold as unauthorized misbranded drugs subject to seizure and federal penalties. Similar FDA warning letters for false advertising and unproven health claims about oregano essential oil products were published in 2017 and 2018.

Chemical components
Oregano contains polyphenols, including numerous flavones.

The essential oil of oregano is composed primarily of monoterpenoids and monoterpenes, with the relative concentration of each compound varying widely across geographic origin and other factors. Over 60 different compounds have been identified, with the primary ones being carvacrol and thymol ranging to over 80%, while lesser abundant compounds include p-cymene, γ-terpinene, caryophyllene, spathulenol, germacrene D, β-fenchyl alcohol and δ-terpineol.

Drying of the plant material affects both quantity and distribution of volatile compounds, with methods using higher heat and longer drying times having greater negative impact. A sample of fresh whole plant material found to contain 33 g/kg dry weight (3.1 g/kg wet) decreased to below a third after warm-air convection drying. Much higher concentrations of volatile compounds are achieved towards the end of the growing season.

Other plants called "oregano"
 Coleus amboinicus, known as Cuban oregano,  ('pennyroyal oregano'),  ('French oregano'), Mexican mint, Mexican thyme, and many other names, is also of the mint family (Lamiaceae).  It has large and somewhat succulent leaves.  Common throughout the tropics, including Latin America, Africa, and Southeast Asia, it is probably of eastern-hemisphere origin.
The flavor of Mexican oregano has a stronger savory component instead of the piney hint of rosemary-like flavor in true oregano, and its citrus accent might be more aromatic than in oregano. It is becoming more commonly sold outside of Mexico, especially in the southeastern United States. It is sometimes used as a substitute for epazote leaves.
It is used as an herb in the Mexican states of Chihuahua and Coahuila.

See also
 Thymus vulgaris, thyme

References

External links

 Flora Europaea: Origanum vulgare
 Germplasm Resources Information Network: Origanum vulgare

Flora of Asia
Flora of Europe
Herbs
Medicinal plants
Origanum
Flora of the Mediterranean Basin
Mediterranean cuisine
New Mexican cuisine
Plants described in 1753